Asen Peshev (5 March 1908-28 June 1967) was а Bulgarian footballer who played as a striker or left wing.

Club career
He started playing in the Sofia club Vladislav in 1923. In 1924 he moved to Levski Sofia where he stayed thirteen seasons. He also played in Jidenitse and Moravska Slava Burno. In Levski he played ninety-nine games scoring a total of eighty-six goals.

International career
On the Bulgarian national team he played during 1927-1936 in forty games (eighteen of which he was captain), scoring eleven goals. Remarkably, he achieved this without ever scoring a brace. He was declared the number 1 footballer in Bulgaria in 1931 in a survey of the popular players in the magazine Sport. He was an inseparable part of the glorious pair with Asen Panchev. He is characterised by his inborn talent, high culture and gallantry, with his physical power and outstanding left foot. He has been referred to as the King of the Volleys.

He was part of the Bulgaria team that won two back-to-back Balkan Cups in 1931 and in 1932, contributing with 1 and 2 goals respectively. He also scored once in the 1934-35 edition and twice in 1936, to bring his Balkan Cup goal tally total up to 9 goals, which puts him among the all-time top goal scorer in the competition's history. With 9 goals in the Balkan Cup, he falls just one short of teammate Asen Panchev, who has 10.

Statistics

International

International goals
''Bulgaria score listed first, score column indicates score after each Peshev goal.

Honours

Club
Levski Sofia
Bulgarian First League: 1933, 1937
Sofia Championship: 1924–25, 1928–29, 1932–33, 1936–37
Tsar's Cup: 1933, 1937
Ulpia Serdika Cup: 1926, 1930, 1931, 1932

International
Bulgaria
Balkan Cup: 1931, 1932

Individual
Bulgarian First League Top-scorer: 1933 (27 goals)
Bulgarian Footballer of the Year: 1931

References

1908 births
1967 deaths
Bulgarian footballers
Bulgaria international footballers
Association football forwards
Association football midfielders